10-formyltetrahydrofolate dehydrogenase is an enzyme that in humans is encoded by the ALDH1L1 gene.

The protein encoded by this gene catalyzes the conversion of 10-formyltetrahydrofolate, NADP, and water to tetrahydrofolate, NADPH, and carbon dioxide. The encoded protein belongs to the aldehyde dehydrogenase family and is responsible for formate oxidation in vivo. Deficiencies in this gene can result in an accumulation of formate and subsequent methanol poisoning.

References

External links

Further reading